Eleias Konstantinos Himaras (born March 8, 2002) is a Canadian soccer player who plays for York United of the Canadian Premier League.

Early life
Himaras began playing youth soccer at age five with London NorWest Optimist SC. He later joined London Alliance FC at age seven for a year, before joining London Portuguese Fury. He later joined the Toronto FC Academy in 2018.

Club career
On September 18, 2018, he made his senior debut at age sixteen with Toronto FC III in League1 Ontario in a 6-0 loss to Vaughan Azzurri. In 2019, he served as a reserve keeper with Toronto FC II in USL League One, but did not appear in any matches. After Toronto FC II withdrew from the 2020 season due to the COVID-19 pandemic, Himaras returned to his hometown of London, Ontario to train.

In 2021, he played with FC London in League1 Ontario, appearing in 10 of the team's 11 matches, winning seven games with two clean sheets. Later in 2021, he joined York United FC of the Canadian Premier League on an emergency basis, to serve as a substitute after an injury to starting goalkeeper Nathan Ingham.

In 2022, after spending the preseason with York United, Himaras signed with Electric City FC of League1 Ontario. He made his debut on May 21 in a 2-1 victory over ProStars FC.

In July 2022, Himaras re-joined York United on a permanent basis. He made his debut on August 7 against Valour FC, coming on as a first-half substitute for Niko Giantsopoulos after the latter suffered an injury. He made his first start in the next match on August 14, in a 3-2 victory over FC Edmonton. In December 2022, he re-signed for another year, with an option for 2024.

International career
In March 2019, he was called up to the Canada U17 team for a training camp. He was later named to the Canadian roster for the 2019 FIFA U-17 World Cup, where he made his debut against New Zealand.

Career statistics

References

External links
 

2002 births
Living people
York United FC players
Canadian soccer players
Canadian people of Greek descent
League1 Ontario players
Electric City FC players
FC London players
Canadian Premier League players
Association football goalkeepers
Canada men's youth international soccer players
Toronto FC players
Toronto FC II players